Taliso Engel (born 4 June 2002) is a blind German para swimmer who competes in international elite competitions.

Career
He is a World champion and European champion in the breaststroke. He competed at the 2020 Summer Paralympics and won a gold medal in the 100 metre breaststroke SB13 event.

References

External links
 
 

2002 births
Living people
People from Lauf an der Pegnitz
Sportspeople from Middle Franconia
Paralympic swimmers of Germany
Medalists at the World Para Swimming Championships
Medalists at the World Para Swimming European Championships
Swimmers at the 2020 Summer Paralympics
German male breaststroke swimmers
S13-classified Paralympic swimmers
21st-century German people